The 2022–23 season is Hibernian's  sixth season of play back in the Scottish Premiership, top division of Scottish football, having been promoted from the Scottish Championship at the end of the 2016–17 season. Hibs were knocked out of the Scottish Cup in the fourth round and at the group stage of the League Cup.

Ron Gordon, who was the majority shareholder and executive chairman of Hibs, died from cancer in February 2023. He was succeeded as chairman by Malcolm McPherson, while Gordon's widow and children inherited the majority shareholding and took seats on the club board.

Results and fixtures

Friendlies

Scottish Premiership

Scottish Cup

Matches

Scottish League Cup

Hibs entered the 2022–23 Scottish League Cup at the group stage, and were drawn in Group D along with Morton, Falkirk, Clyde and SPFL newcomers Bonnyrigg Rose. A defeat by Falkirk and a penalty shootout loss against Morton left Hibs on the brink of elimination at the group stage. Their elimination was confirmed when it transpired that Hibs had fielded a player who was under suspension (Rocky Bushiri) against Morton, which meant that they forfeited the match.

Matches

Player statistics

|-
! colspan=13 style=background:#dcdcdc; text-align:center| Goalkeepers
|-

|-
! colspan=13 style=background:#dcdcdc; text-align:center| Defenders
|-

|-
! colspan=13 style=background:#dcdcdc; text-align:center| Midfielders
|-

|-
! colspan=13 style=background:#dcdcdc; text-align:center| Forwards
|-

Club statistics

League table

League Cup table

Management statistics

Transfers

Players in

Players out

Loans in

Loans out

See also
List of Hibernian F.C. seasons

Notes

References

2022-23
Scottish football clubs 2022–23 season